Charles Wicks (born March 6, 1978) is an American retired professional wrestler best known for his time with the World Wrestling Entertainment (WWE). While part of WWE, Wicks wrestled as Chad Toland in its Ohio Valley Wrestling branch and later as Chad Dick on its SmackDown! brand.

Professional wrestling career

Early career and training
In 2000, Wicks started his training at the Chaotic Training Center in North Andover, Massachusetts as "Lifesaver" Billy Kryptonite. He began his career in the Chaotic Wrestling promotion, but was called on by the Inoki Dojo after they had seen a shoot style match between Wicks and John Brooks. On January 16, 2004, John Walters defeated him in a "Loser Leaves Chaotic Wrestling" match.

In early 2004 Wicks began to train at the Inoki Dojo in California. He also competed for the New Japan Pro-Wrestling Young Lions Cup and teamed with Jushin Thunder Liger.

World Wrestling Entertainment (2004–2006)

In May 2004, Wicks signed a developmental deal and reported to Ohio Valley Wrestling (OVW) in June. On December 1, 2004 he began appearing on OVW programming under the name Chad Toland (sub for Tank Toland) and defeated Chris Cage to capture the OVW Heavyweight Championship. The next year he began to team with Tank Toland as The Blond Bombers and on April 12, 2005 the team won the OVW Southern Tag Team Title from the Thrillseekers.

He made his WWE debut as Chad Dick along with his partner, James Dick (Toland) on the October 14, 2005 of WWE Friday Night SmackDown as one-half of The Dicks. After The Mexicools won their 8-man tag match with Road Warrior Animal and Heidenreich by defeating Paul Burchill and William Regal and MNM, the winners were ambushed by the Dicks, laying out Super Crazy and Psicosis with two of their signature tag team maneuvers. They made their in-ring debut November 5 on Velocity, defeating jobbers and expanding on their gimmick as Chippendale dancers.  On the November 25 episode of SmackDown, they made their official SmackDown debuts, defeating Heidenreich and Road Warrior Animal after blinding Animal with lotion. They ultimately became regulars on Velocity before a final appearance on the February 24, 2006 edition of SmackDown! where they were defeated by The Boogeyman in a handicap match. Shortly after the taping, they were released.

Personal life
On November 14, 2016, Wicks joined a class action lawsuit against WWE, litigated by Konstantine Kyros, who has been involved in a number of other lawsuits against them, alleging that "he is suffering from multiple symptoms of repetitive traumatic brain injuries and is undergoing neurological care." US District Judge Vanessa Lynne Bryant dismissed the lawsuit in September 2018.

Championships and accomplishments
AWA Superstars of Wrestling
AWA Superstars of Wrestling World Tag Team Championship (1 time) - GQ Gallo
Chaotic Wrestling
Chaotic Wrestling Heavyweight Championship (1 time)
Chaotic Wrestling New England Championship (2 times)
Ohio Valley Wrestling
OVW Heavyweight Championship (1 time)
OVW Southern Tag Team Championship (1 time) - with Tank Toland

References

1976 births
21st-century professional wrestlers
American male professional wrestlers
Living people
People from Mason City, Iowa
People from Margate City, New Jersey
Professional wrestlers from Iowa
Sportspeople from Louisville, Kentucky
OVW Heavyweight Champions